John Lambie may refer to:

 John Lambie (engineer)
 John Lambie (footballer, born 1868), Scottish international football player
 John Lambie (footballer, born 1941), Scottish football player (Falkirk, St Johnstone) and manager (Partick Thistle)

See also
John Lambe, astrologer
John Lambe (M5 rapist)